Alexander William Kinglake (5 August 1809 – 2 January 1891) was an English travel writer and historian.

He was born near Taunton, Somerset, and educated at Eton College and Trinity College, Cambridge. He was called to the Bar in 1837, and built up a thriving legal practice, which, in 1856, he abandoned to devote himself to literature and public life.

His first literary venture was Eothen; or Traces of travel brought home from the East (London: J. Ollivier, 1844), a very popular work of Eastern travel, apparently first published anonymously, in which he described a journey he made about ten years earlier in Syria, Palestine and Egypt, together with his Eton contemporary Lord Pollington. Elliot Warburton said it evoked "the East itself in vital actual reality" and it was instantly successful. However, his magnum opus was The Invasion of Crimea: Its Origin, and an Account of its Progress down to the Death of Lord Raglan, in 8 volumes, published from 1863 to 1887 by Blackwood, Edinburgh, one of the most effective works of its class. The History, which Geoffrey Bocca describes as a book "by which no intelligent man can fail immediately to be fascinated, no matter to what page he might open it" has been accused of being too favourable to Lord Raglan and unduly hostile to Napoleon III for whom the author had an extreme aversion.

The town of Kinglake in Victoria, Australia, and the adjacent national park are named after him.

A Whig, Kinglake was elected at the 1857 general election as one of the two Members of Parliament (MP) for Bridgwater, having unsuccessfully contested the seat in 1852. He was returned at next two general elections, but the result of the 1868 general election in Bridgwater was voided on petition on 26 February 1869. No by-election was held, and after a Royal Commission found that there had been extensive corruption, the town was disenfranchised in 1870.

In the late 1880s he developed cancer of the throat, and he died on 2 January 1891.

Notes

References
 

Drabble, M. (ed.) (1983) The Oxford Companion to English Literature. Oxford: U. P.; p. 534

External links 

 
 
 
 

 The Invasion of the Crimea, vol1 - vol2 - vol3 - vol4 - vol5 - vol6 - vol7 - vol8 - vol9

Alumni of Trinity College, Cambridge
19th-century English historians
English travel writers
People educated at Eton College
People from Taunton
British people of the Crimean War
1809 births
1891 deaths
People from Somerset
Whig (British political party) MPs
Members of the Parliament of the United Kingdom for English constituencies
UK MPs 1857–1859
UK MPs 1859–1865
UK MPs 1865–1868
UK MPs 1868–1874